Samuel Emmanuel (1803 – 11 July 1868) was an English-born Australian politician.

He was born at Portsmouth to Moses Emmanuel and his wife Rosetta. He migrated to Australia in 1832, becoming a businessman before opening a store at Goulburn in 1845. In 1862 he was elected to the New South Wales Legislative Assembly for Argyle, serving until his defeat in 1864. Emmanuel died in Sydney in 1868.

References

 

1803 births
1868 deaths
Members of the New South Wales Legislative Assembly
19th-century Australian politicians